Manpreet Tiwana is a Punjabi songwriter/lyricist from Punjab, India. He was born on June 1, 1977 in Mehal Kalan, Punjab and spent his childhood there. In his childhood, he moved to Bathinda, the city of lakes, to pursue his life.

Career
He wrote songs for Punjabi films including Kabaddi Ik Mohabbat, Desi Munde. Also, he delivered judgments in various cultural activities such as youth festival of academic year 2015-16 of Guru Kashi University, Talwandi Sabo. His famous songs are:

References
 

Punjabi-language lyricists
Punjabi people
Living people
Punjabi-language songwriters
Year of birth missing (living people)